The 1989 Tampa Bay Buccaneers season was the franchise's 14th season in the National Football League the 14th playing their home games at Tampa Stadium and the third under head coach  Ray Perkins. The team  matched on a 5–11 season in 1988, in which finished winning two of their last three games including an upset of the 1988 AFC East Champion Buffalo Bills (a win that was not only Tampa Bay's high point of the season, but turned out to be hugely impactful on the AFC playoff picture, as Buffalo's loss combined with an overtime win by the Cincinnati Bengals over Washington in the season finale meant that the Bengals clinched the home-field advantage that would have otherwise gone to the Bills; Cincinnati ended up winning a close AFC title game at home against Buffalo and got to Super Bowl XXIII. The season started with a road win against the improved Green Bay Packers, and game two brought the Super Bowl champion San Francisco 49ers and Joe Montana to Tampa Stadium. With Joe trying to direct a 4th quarter comeback, cornerback Ricky Reynolds dropped what would have been a game ending interception on second down in the end zone. On third down, Montana rolled out and ran untouched into the endzone for a winning TD that left a rare sellout crowd stunned and silent in defeat. The Bucs extended their record to 3–2 by beating the hated Chicago Bears finally in Tampa Stadium, holding off the Bears to a 42–35 victory. It was an impressive win, but then the Bucs lost to the Detroit Lions in the last minute and entered into an overall five-game losing-streak tailspin. Tampa Bay would sweep Chicago to end the streak (an achievement which was diluted by the Bears having their worst season in several years) but ended with a disappointing 5–11 record. James Wilder Sr.’s final season was highlighted by a 100-yard receiving game in week 9. Many fans felt the Bucs were far better than the final record suggested, and offseason acquisitions would help the Bucs win the next year.

Offseason

NFL draft

Roster

Regular season

Schedule

Notes:
Division opponents in bold text

Season summary

Week 1: at Green Bay Packers

Week 9: vs. Cleveland Browns

Standings

References
 Buccaneers on Pro Football Reference

Tampa Bay Buccaneers season
Tampa Bay Buccaneers
20th century in Tampa, Florida
Tampa Bay Buccaneers seasons